Uromastyx macfadyeni, Macfadyen's mastigure, is a species of agamid lizard. It is found in Somalia.

References

Uromastyx
Reptiles of Somalia
Reptiles described in 1932
Taxa named by Hampton Wildman Parker